Hardcore Championship may refer to:
 WWF Hardcore Championship created 1998, renamed WWE Hardcore Championship in 2002, retired same year
 WCW Hardcore Championship created 21 November 1999, retired in 2001
 ECCW Hardcore Championship created 26 November 1999, still active
 OVW Hardcore Championship created in 2000 retired in 2001, held twice by Randy Orton
 MCW Hardcore Championship created and retired February and June 2001